is a Japanese actress, writer, and UNFPA Goodwill Ambassador.

Life and career
She made her acting debut in 1951. In the 1950s, David Lean had proposed her for the main role in The Wind Cannot Read, which is about a Japanese language instructor in India circa-1943 who falls in love with a British officer, but the project fell through.

Kishi married the French director Yves Ciampi in 1957, and commuted for a while between Paris and Japan to continue her acting career. In 1963 a daughter, Delphine Ciampi, a musician and composer, was born. She divorced her husband in 1975.

Since 1996 she has been a Goodwill Ambassador for the United Nations Population Fund (UNFPA).

In 2002, she won the Japan Academy Prize for best actress for her role in the film Kah-chan.

Filmography

Film

 Home Sweet Home (1951)
 Hibari no Sākasu Kanashiki Kobato (1952)
 The Garden of Women (1954)
 Takekurabe (1955)
 Early Spring (1956)
 Typhoon Over Nagasaki (1957)
 Untamed (1957)
 Snow Country (1957)
 Her Brother (1960)
 Ten Dark Women (1961)
 The Inheritance (1962) 
 Love Under the Crucifix (1962)
 Rififi in Tokyo (1963)
 Kwaidan (1964)
 Mastermind (1969)
 The Rendezvous (1972)
 Tora-san Loves an Artist (1973)
 The Yakuza (1974)
 The Fossil (1975)
 Akuma No Temari-uta (1977)
 Rhyme of Vengeance (1977)
 Hunter in the Dark (1979)
 Koto (1980)
 The Makioka Sisters (1983)
 Kah-chan (2001)
 The Twilight Samurai (2002)
 Grave of the Fireflies (2005)
 Snow Prince (2009)

Television
 Taikōki  (1965), Oichi
 Mango no Ki no Shita de (2019), Rinko

Honours 
Kinuyo Tanaka Award (1990)
Order of the Rising Sun, 4th Class, Gold Rays with Rosette (2004)

References

External links

Japanese film actresses
1932 births
Living people
People from Yokohama
20th-century Japanese actresses
21st-century Japanese actresses
Japanese officials of the United Nations
Japanese expatriates in France
Recipients of the Order of the Rising Sun, 4th class